The 2020–21 St. Francis Brooklyn Terriers men's basketball team represented St. Francis College during the 2020–21 NCAA Division I men's basketball season. The team's head coach was Glenn Braica, who is in his 11th season as the head men's basketball coach. The Terriers play their home games at the Generoso Pope Athletic Complex in Brooklyn Heights, New York as members of the Northeast Conference.

Previous season
The Terriers finished the 2019–20 season 13–18, 7–11 in NEC play to finish in a three-way tie for seventh place. They lost in the quarterfinals of the NEC tournament to Robert Morris.

Roster

Schedule and results
 
|-
!colspan=12 style="background:#0038A8; border: 2px solid #CE1126;;color:#FFFFFF;"| Regular Season

|-

Source:

References

St. Francis Brooklyn Terriers men's basketball seasons
Saint Francis Brooklyn
Saint Francis Brooklyn Terriers men's basketball
Saint Francis Brooklyn Terriers men's basketball